Vykuntapali is a  2011 Telugu-language Indian crime drama film written and directed by Anil Gopireddy. The film is produced by Maram Bhuvaneswar and Pandem Satyadeep Reddy under the banner Hare Rama Hare Krishna Entertainments. The film stars Krishnudu, Ajay and Randhir in the lead roles. Tashu Kaushik played the main female lead in the film opposite Ajay. The film also stars Satya Krishnan, Rajiv Kanakala, Tanikella Bharani and Posani Krishna Murali in pivotal roles. The film performed poorly at the box office and received mixed reviews.

Plot 
The film opens with a bank ATM robbery scene in which Chandu (Krishnudu) and Michael (Randhir) steal lakhs of rupees from a bank ATM and manage to escape. KKR (Harsha Vardhan) is the investigating crime branch police officer for the case. He finds the wallet of Chandu in the crime scene and the purse contains Kranthi's visiting card in it.

Kranthi (Ajay), Chandu and Michael are three friends with three different mind sets. Kranthi wants to become a journalist and do something great for the society. Chandu wants to see his mother (Indu Anand) happy by helping her recover from her sickness. Michael just wants to live a lavish life without working hard.

After three years, one morning Kranthi is shown shooting Police Officer Murthy (Ravi Prakash) in his car. Chandu is seen working in an office and taking care of his unwell mother. Michael is enjoying his life borrowing money from all his friends without any thought of repaying them. Ajay is working for a software company where his team leader Snigdha (Tashu Kaushik) falls for him and persuades him for marriage. Kranthi is also seen supporting a charity called Prithvi Charitable Trust and is in need of 6 lakh rupees for newly joined orphan children study fees.

Doctor Padma (Sana) reveals Chandu that his mother is attacked with CNP which is a dangerous disease and she should get operated as soon as possible. He needs up to 7 lakhs for his mother's surgery. Michael disguises himself as Nitin Verma from IMBI Bank with a fake visiting card and goes to Mr. Reddy, the owner of a company where his friend Gaurav works. He manages to loot 1 lakh rupees from Reddy saying that he will arrange a bank loan for his company. Michael escapes from his home when his friend Gaurav calls and tells him that Reddy found about his fraud through Frederick, a guy who worked for Michael. While escaping, Michael meets his friends Chandu and Kranthi. Michael lies to his friends that he returned from the U.S. and is now planning to go to Singapore. Chandu offers his friend Michael to stay in his home along with his mother until he leaves to Singapore instead of staying in a hotel. When Kranthi gets a call, he leaves giving his visiting card to his friend Chandu. Then, Kranthi is shown stabbing Rao (Posani Krishna Murali).

The manager of Chandu (Jeeva) gives him promotion but doesn't give him salary increment. Depressed Chandu asks him to arrange some amount for his mother's surgery. While Chandu is worried about his mother's health, Michael enjoys with Chandu's money in his house and abuses Chandu's mother for coughing and disturbing him. He gives sleeping pills to Chandu's mother and also steals 50,000 rupees from Chandu's office money for his Singapore flight ticket. Chandu is liable for that money and is asked to repay immediately by his boss. Upon telling this to Michael, wicked Michael advises Chandu to go to his boss and admit the mistake seeking his help. Panicked Chandu goes to the hotel where his boss is staying and there he gets hurt with a bullet fired by Kranthi aiming to kill Prachanda (Subbaraju). Chandu is rescued by Kranthi and then upon being questioned by Chandu, Kranthi reveals his flashback behind his secret killings.

Prithvi (Rajiv Kanakala) is the guru of Kranthi when he started his career as a budding journalist. Prithvi besides being a daring and talented journalist, he runs his own charity to support orphan children needs and education. He interviews health minister (Tanikella Bharani) about his pharmaceutical drug scam involving Rao and Prachanda, a business tycoon. All that is telecasted live by Tanmayi (Satya Krishnan), Prithvi's wife. Upon Kranthi's hint, Prithvi, Kranthi and Tanmayi investigate the drug scam details and plan to telecast it the next day. While they were discussing about this operation, Prithvi reveals their plan to Murthy, his friend. Murthy betrays Prithvi and reveals all these details to Prachanda. That night, Prachanda comes to the house of Prithvi along with Health Minister and Rao. He threatens Prithvi, molests Tanmayi and kills both of them. Angered Kranthi is doing all these secret murders to take revenge upon Prachanda, Murthy, Rao and Health Minister who are responsible for Prithvi and Tanmayi's death.

While Chandu thinks of asking money for his mother's surgery from Kranthi, Kranthi calls Chandu for help in arranging 6 lakhs to his trust by mortgaging his land documents. Desperate Chandu decides to rob a bank along with Michael. While Kranthi realises his love for Snigdha, she quits her job and decides to marry another man as she thinks Kranthi doesn't love her. One night, Chandu comes to Kranthi and reveals that he and Michael planned for the bank robbery and after robbery, Michael ditched him and escaped with the money. While Kranthi is worried about Chandu and himself, KKR comes to Kranthi's home for investigation. The climax is all about how Kranthi solved Chandu's problem.

Cast 

 Krishnudu as Chandu
 Ajay as Kranthi Kumar
 Randhir as Michael
 Tashu Kaushik as Snigdha
 Rajiv Kanakala as Prithvi
 Satya Krishnan as Tanmayi
 Tanikella Bharani as A.P. Health Minister
 Posani Krishna Murali as Pharmaceuticals Rao
 Subbaraju as Prachanda
 Jeeva as Chandu's manager
 Harsha Vardhan as KKR alias Kakarlapudi Krishna Ram, Special Officer Crime Branch
 Ravi Prakash as Murthy, Police Officer 
 Sana as Dr. Padma
 Indu Anand as Chandu's mother
 Sarath

Music 
The songs were composed by Anil Gopireddy and the lyrics were penned by Ramajogayya Sastry and Avinash.

References

External links 
 

Indian crime drama films
2011 directorial debut films
2011 films
Indian heist films